Paniara is a census town in Panchla CD Block of Howrah Sadar subdivision in Howrah district in the Indian state of West Bengal.

Geography
Paniara is located at

Demographics
As per 2011 Census of India Paniara had a total population of 7,787 of which 3,961 (51%) were males and 3,826 (49%) were females. Population below 6 years was 984. The total number of literates in Paniara was 5,463 (80.30% of the population over 6 years).

 India census, Paniara had a population of 6708. Males constitute 51% of the population and females 49%. Paniara has an average literacy rate of 62%, higher than the national average of 59.5%: male literacy is 68%, and female literacy is 56%. In Paniara, 15% of the population is under 6 years of age.

Transport
Paniara is located on NH 6.

References

Cities and towns in Howrah district